Rakesh Bhanuprasad Patel (born 3 October 1978 in Ahmedabad, Gujarat, India), is an Indian cricketer who plays for the Ahmedabad Rockets in the Indian Cricket League.

Patel, primarily a right-arm fast-medium bowler, played 66 first-class matches for Gujarat and Baroda before signing for the ICL, where he first played for the Mumbai Champs before moving to the newly formed Rockets team.

He scored six half-centuries at first-class level and took 234 wickets.

In 2019, it was discovered he is now a street vendor for indian tea ('chaiwala') in the province of Anand, which is a satellite city of Ahmadabad.

References
 Player profile from Cricket Archive

Living people
1978 births
Gujarat cricketers
Baroda cricketers
West Zone cricketers
Indian cricketers
Ahmedabad Rockets cricketers
Cricketers from Ahmedabad